KSBS-FM (92.1 FM) is Samoa's first commercial FM radio station broadcasting a variety format including local Polynesian, oldies, easy listening music. KSBS-FM broadcasts religious programming on Sunday mornings as well as hourly news from the BBC World Service, NPR, Voice of America, Radio Australia and Radio New Zealand International.  Licensed by the U.S. Federal Communications Commission to Pago Pago, American Samoa, it serves the general American Samoa area.  Also known as "Island 92", KSBS-FM is owned by Samoa Technologies.

The station was assigned the KSBS-FM call letters by the Federal Communications Commission on April 6, 1988.

History of call letters
The call letters KSBS were earlier assigned to an FM station in Kansas City, Kansas, which began broadcasting October 5, 1947. It operated on 105.9 MHz and was licensed to Sunflower Broadcasting System Incorporated.

References

External links
 Samoa Technologies corporate website
 KSBS-FM Island 92 KSBS-FM Island 92 website
 
 
 

SBS
Variety radio stations in the United States
Radio stations established in 1988
Pago Pago
1988 establishments in American Samoa